The 2016 V.League 2 (referred to as Kienlongbank V.League 2 for sponsorship reasons) was the 22nd season of V.League 2, Vietnam's second tier professional football league, which began on 9 April 2016 and ended on 20 August 2016.

Changes from last season

Team changes
The following teams had changed division since the 2015 season.

To V.League 2
Promoted from Vietnamese Second League
 Cà Mau
 Fico Tây Ninh
 Viettel
Relegated from V.League 1
 Đồng Nai

From V.League 2
Relegated to Vietnamese Second League
  Công An Nhân DânPromoted to V.League 1
 Hà Nội (Sài Gòn)

Rule changes
In season 2016, clubs finishing second, third and fourth will play play-off matches for a place in the 2016 V.League 1 play-off match with the 13th-placed of 2016 V.League 1.

Teams

Stadiums and locations

Personnel and kits

League table

Results

Play-off match

Play-off I match 
The team which finish 3rd faced the team which finish 4th. The winner earned entry into the play-off II match.

Nam Định advanced to Play-off II match.

Play-off II match 
The team which finish 2nd faced the winner of play-off I match. The winner earned entry into the play-off match with the 13th-placed team of 2016 V.League 1

Viettel advanced to Play-off match with V.League 1 team.

Positions by round

Season statistics

Top scorers

Own goals

Hattrick

See also  
 2016 V.League 1
 2016 Vietnamese National Football Second League
 2016 Vietnamese National Football Third League

References

External links
Official Page

Second level Vietnamese football league seasons
2
Viet
Viet